Padosan is a 1968 Indian Hindi-language musical comedy film directed by Jyoti Swaroop and produced by Mehmood, N. C. Sippy and written by Rajendra Krishan. It is a remake of the Bengali-language film Pasher Bari (1952) based on a short story of the same name by Arun Chowdhury starring Bhanu Bandyopadhyay and Sabitri Chatterjee. The film stars Sunil Dutt and Saira Banu. Kishore Kumar, Mukri, Raj Kishore and Keshto Mukherjee played the supporting roles. Mehmood as the South Indian musician and rival to Sunil Dutt is among the highlights of the film. Indiatimes Movies ranked the film amongst the "Top 25 Must See Bollywood Films". Music was composed by R. D. Burman. Kumar sang for himself while Manna Dey sang for Mehmood. Many of the scenes were shot in Brindavan Gardens located near the city of Mysore.

Plot
Bhola, an innocent young man lives with his maternal uncle (Mama) Kunwar Pratap Singh. Bhola is enraged at Pratap Singh who has been searching for a girl to marry despite his wife being alive. Angry, he leaves his uncle's house and moves in to live with his Aunt (Pratap's wife). There, he finds a beautiful neighbour Bindu and falls in love with her. Bindu however, gets annoyed by Bhola and refutes his advances. Vidyapati, who is a singer and theater actor and Bhola's friend and mentor comes to his rescue and spies on Bindu.

Bindu tolerates advances of her South Indian music teacher Master Pillai / Masterji. Vidyapathi realizes that Bindu loves music and that is the reason for her closeness with Master Pillai. He tries to teach Bhola to sing but fails miserably. Inspired by dubbed songs, he devises an idea and asks Bhola to mimic the lyrics to songs while he does the real singing in the background himself. Their plan to impress Bindu succeeds and Bindu slowly starts falling for Bhola, much to the chagrin of Pillai.

When singing at Bindu's birthday party, one of her friends becomes suspicious at Bhola's voice. She leads Bindu to discover Bhola's fake act. It makes Bindu angry and in a fit of rage, she agrees to the marriage proposal of Kunwar Pratap Singh, which she had earlier rejected upon knowing that he is Bhola's Maternal Uncle. Vidyapathi and his gang visit Pratap Singh and plead him to reject the proposal for his nephew's love, to which Pratap Singh agrees. This further enrages Bindu who decides to marry Pillai, just to get even with Bhola.

Helpless to stop the wedding, Vidyapathi comes up a last-ditch plan to fake Bhola's suicide. They arrange a suicide scene and start shouting and mourning Bhola's "death". Everyone arrives at the scene including Bindu who is deeply shocked and tries to wake him up. Vidyapathi tells her that only her unrequited love could have a chance of bringing the dead back and encourages her to try harder. After some more pretending, Bhola finally cries and wakes up, embracing Bindu. Everyone including Master Pillai is happy and shocked to see the power of true love. In the end, Bhola's Maternal Uncle and Aunt also reconcile and bless the newlywed couple. In the last scene of movie, Master Pillai is shown playing 'Shehnai' with tears in his eyes.

Cast

Music
The music was composed by R. D. Burman. The lyrics were written by Rajendra Krishan.

Kishore Kumar's character in the film was inspired by the personality of his uncle, Dhananjay Banerjee (a classical singer), and music director Khemchand Prakash. The song Ek Chatur Naar was originally sung in the 1941 movie Jhoola by Ashok Kumar.

Legacy

Indiatimes Movies ranked the film amongst the "Top 25 Must See Bollywood Films" Amit Upadhaya of ThePrint in a retrospective article on film's 50th anniversary wrote ″As cult comedy films go, Jyoti Swaroop’s Padosan is one of the few in Hindi film history to never run out of laughs. This is an even more remarkable trophy because such a movie cannot be made again in today’s Republic of the Easily Offended, i.e., India. The trademark innocent lunacy of the lovable film turned 50 this year″ In a similar 50th anniversary article, Devansh Sharma of Firstpost gave credit to RD Burman's music for changing the state of comedy genre in Hindi films as he felt that ″Burman's music gave wings to the camera that was otherwise doomed to sit still. Krishan's poetry also allowed the editor and director a lot of freedom as they could choose the appropriate shot for every emotion expressed in the songs.″

Characters of animated series Guru Aur Bhole which aired on Sony Yay, were inspired by Kishore Kumar's and Sunil Dutt's characters from the film. The voice artist for the character Guru is Amit Kumar, son of Kishore Kumar.

References

External links
 

1968 films
Hindi remakes of Bengali films
1960s Hindi-language films
Films scored by R. D. Burman
Films based on short fiction
Indian films with live action and animation